Frederick Wood (1807 – 18 November 1893) was an English surveyor and land agent who lived and worked in Rugby, Warwickshire from about 1840 to 1881.
He was also a member of the first Local board of health, and clerk to the Rugby petty sessions (1831 to 1871).

Early life and education
Wood was born in Southam, Warwickshire circa 1807.

Early Career in Rugby
He was employed by the Oxford Canal Co from 1831 to 1857. From 1855 he was a land agent to the L&NWR Railway to 1881. Whilst in Rugby he was an Inspector and a director of the Rugby Gas & Coke Co. In 1868 he became a founder member of the Institution of Surveyors (now the Royal Institution of Chartered Surveyors). He was elected to the Rugby local board of health the first in the country in September 1834.

Writings
As well as numerous plans, sections and drawings, around 1842 Wood produced a "Chain Book". A roughly A5 sized calf-bound Book containing a survey of the Oxford Canal, with every two pages covering a mile and listing all the weirs, locks, bridges, wharves, toll offices and other features, with details about them.

Family
He married Jemima Elizabeth Worth, daughter of William Worth of Dunchurch, Warwickshire on 19 October 1830 at St. Peter's, Dunchurch.
They had six sons, Frederick Ormiston Wood, George Frederick Wood, Alfred Wood, Hubert James Wood, Charles Wood, Frank Ernest Wood. Hubert attended Rugby School from age 11 in 1850

References

External links
http://www.rugby-local-history.org
https://canalrivertrust.org.uk/news-and-views/blog/nigel-crowe/the-oxford-canal-chain-book

1807 births
1893 deaths
English surveyors
Oxford Canal